Brandon Neel (born December 7, 1992) is an American professional basketball player, born in Cincinnati, Ohio. He most recently played for Buras Guaymas, Mexico as a shooting guard in 2021. He has played for South Plains College, Midwestern State Mustangs and La Salle High School (Cincinnati, Ohio).

Early life and college career 
Neel was born and raised in Cincinnati, Ohio. Neel attended La Salle High School (Cincinnati, Ohio) where he averaged 14.6 points per game. Neel led La Salle to a 28-2 record and the 2011 state championship. In 2011, Neel was The Enquirer Division I player of the year and was named the most outstanding player in the state tournament.

Neel started his college career with the South Plains College Texans, where he averaged 10.1 points per game to go along with 5.7 rebounds per game. Neel played for Midwestern State University from 2016-2018. In his final two years, Neel averaged 18.8 points per game to go along with 5.8 rebounds per game.

Professional career 
In 2019, Neel was signed by the Moncton Magic for the 2019-2020 for the National Basketball League of Canada (NBL Canada). 

In 2020, Neel was signed by Neptune Basketball Club for the 2020-2021 season in the Super League (Ireland)

In 2021, Neel was signed by Buras Guaymas for the 2021 season in the Circuito de Baloncesto de la Costa del Pacífico. Neel averaged 22.3 points per game to go along with 5.7 rebounds per game.

References 

1992 births
Living people
American expatriate basketball people in Canada
American men's basketball players
Basketball players from Cincinnati
Midwestern State Mustangs men's basketball players
Moncton Magic players
Shooting guards
South Plains Texans basketball players
Wright State Raiders men's basketball players